The 1959–60 Cupa României was the 22nd edition of Romania's most prestigious football cup competition.

The title was won by Progresul București against Dinamo Obor București.

Format
The competition is an annual knockout tournament.

In the first round proper, two pots were made, first pot with Divizia A teams and other teams till 16 and the second pot with the rest of teams qualified in this phase. Each tie is played as a single leg.

It is the third season in the history of Cupa României when all the games are played on a neutral location.

If a match is drawn after 90 minutes, the game goes in extra time, and if the scored is still tight after 120 minutes, then a replay will be played. In case the game is still tight after the replay, then the team from lower division will qualify for the next round.

From the first edition, the teams from Divizia A entered in competition in sixteen finals, rule which remained till today.

First round proper

|colspan=3 style="background-color:#FFCCCC;"|29 November 1959

|}

Second round proper

|colspan=3 style="background-color:#FFCCCC;"|6 December 1959

|}

Quarter-finals 

|colspan=3 style="background-color:#FFCCCC;"|15 June 1960

|-
|colspan=3 style="background-color:#FFCCCC;"|22 June 1960

|}

Semi-finals

|colspan=3 style="background-color:#FFCCCC;"|26 June 1960

|}

Final

References

External links
 romaniansoccer.ro
 Official site
 The Romanian Cup on the FRF's official site

Cupa României seasons
1959–60 in Romanian football
Romania